The Hansa-Preis is a Group 2 flat horse race in Germany open to thoroughbreds aged three years or older. It is run at Hamburg-Horn over a distance of 2,400 metres (about 1½ miles), and it is scheduled to take place each year in June or July.

History
The event was established in 1892, and it was originally called the Grosser Hansa-Preis. It was known as the Jubiläums-Preis in 1902 and 1927.

The race was held at Dresden in 1944, but all of its other runnings have taken place at Hamburg. It was titled the Grosser Preis von Berlin in 1962.

The present system of race grading was introduced in Germany in 1972, and the Hansa-Preis was classed at Group 2 level.

The event used to be contested over 2,200 metres. It was extended by 200 metres in 2008.

Records
Most successful horse (2 wins):
 Slusohr – 1898, 1899
 Graf Isolani – 1929, 1930
 Sturmvogel – 1936, 1937
 Opponent – 1963, 1966
 Orofino – 1982, 1983
 Egerton – 2006, 2008
 Protectionist – 2014, 2016
 Dschingis Secret – 2017, 2018

Leading jockey (6 wins):
 Gerhard Streit – Janus (1933), Walzerkönig (1939), Octavianus (1940), Fabier (1955), Masetto (1956), Traumgeist (1957, dead-heat)
 Peter Alafi – Opponent (1963, 1966), Königsstuhl (1981), Orofino (1982, 1983), Ordos (1984)

Leading trainer (9 wins):
 Heinz Jentzsch – Lombard (1972), Arratos (1973), Stuyvesant (1977), Acatenango (1987), Astylos (1988, dead-heat), El Salto (1988, dead-heat), Carlton (1993), Lando (1994), Monsun (1995)

Winners since 1969

Earlier winners

 1892: Nickel
 1893: Dorn
 1894: Alconbury
 1895: Hannibal
 1896: Trollhetta
 1897: Flunkermichel
 1898: Slusohr
 1899: Slusohr
 1900: Over Norton
 1901: Regenwolke / Tuki *
 1902: Nunquamdormio
 1903: Macdonald
 1904: Sorrento
 1905: Inverno
 1906: Festino
 1907: Fels
 1908: Horizont
 1909: For Ever
 1910: Orient
 1911: Star
 1912: Gulliver II
 1913: Cairo / Laudanum *
 1914: Ariel
 1915: no race
 1916: Ritter
 1917: Pergolese
 1918: Wirbel
 1919: Marmor
 1920: Alamund
 1921: Der Mohr
 1922: Wallenstein
 1923: Abgott
 1924: Barde
 1925: Weissdorn
 1926: Aditi
 1927: Torero
 1928: Impressionist / Löwenherz *
 1929: Graf Isolani
 1930: Graf Isolani
 1931: Sichel
 1932: Palastpage
 1933: Janus
 1934: Blinzen
 1935: Athanasius
 1936: Sturmvogel
 1937: Sturmvogel
 1938: Trollius
 1939: Walzerkönig
 1940: Octavianus
 1941: Nuvolari
 1942: Berber
 1943: no race
 1944: Ferolius
 1945–47: no race
 1948: Pfälzerin
 1949: Ataman
 1950: Geweihter
 1951: Mandarin
 1952: Asterios
 1953: Prodomo
 1954: Grenzbock
 1955: Fabier
 1956: Masetto
 1957: Magus / Traumgeist *
 1958: Liperion
 1959: Obermaat
 1960: Waidmann
 1961: Windbruch
 1962: Wicht
 1963: Opponent
 1964: Imperial
 1965: Fanfar
 1966: Opponent
 1967: Agami
 1968: Luciano

* The 1901, 1913, 1928 and 1957 races were dead-heats and have joint winners.

See also
 List of German flat horse races
 Recurring sporting events established in 1892 – this race is included under its original title, Grosser Hansa-Preis.

References
 Racing Post:

 galopp-sieger.de – Großer Hansa-Preis.
 horseracingintfed.com – International Federation of Horseracing Authorities – Hansa-Preis (2012).
 pedigreequery.com – Hansa-Preis – Hamburg.

Open middle distance horse races
Horse races in Germany
Sports competitions in Hamburg